Kameoka, Kyoto held a mayoral election on October 21, 2007. Incumbent Masataka Kuriyama won the election.

Results

References 
 

2007 elections in Japan
Kameoka, Kyoto
Mayoral elections in Japan
October 2007 events in Japan